Mohammed ibn Amr al-Ribati or Abu Abdallah Mohammed ibn Mohammed ibn Amr al-Ansari (died 1 October 1827) was a Moroccan poet from Rabat. He initially worked as a kadi in Rabat and, after 1809, as a teacher in Marrakesh. His works include a diwan, a fahrasa and a rihla which have only partially been preserved. His fame rests for a part on al-Amriyya, a kafiyya made in an imitation of  the Shamakmakiyya of Ibn al-Wannan.

References
M. lakhdar, Vie littéraire sous les Alaouites, pp. 306–309
William C. Brice, An Historical Atlas of Islam, p. 381

Moroccan writers
1827 deaths
Writers from Rabat
19th-century Moroccan people
18th-century Moroccan people
People from Marrakesh
Year of birth missing